KZKE (103.3 FM) is a radio station broadcasting an Oldies format. Licensed to Seligman, Arizona, United States, the station is currently owned by Route 66 Broadcasting, L.L.C., owned by Arizona State Mine Inspector Joe Hart and his wife Rhonda.

History
The station was assigned the call letters KZKE on 1991-10-18. On 1995-12-15, the station changed its call sign to KJJJ, then again on 1997-08-11, to the current KZKE.

Translator
The station is also heard in Kingman, Arizona, through a translator on 95.1 FM.

References

External links
 Official Website
 

ZKE
Radio stations established in 1991
Oldies radio stations in the United States
1991 establishments in Arizona